National Opposition Union (UNO) was a Nicaraguan wide-range coalition of opposition parties formed to oppose president Daniel Ortega's Sandinista National Liberation Front (FSLN) in the 1990 election. Its candidate Violeta Chamorro eventually won the race. UNO traced its origins back to the Nicaraguan Democratic Coordinating Group (Coordinadora Democrática Nicaragüense—CDN), which was formed in 1982 by different opposition groups. At the time of the election, of the UNO coalition's fourteen political parties, four were considered conservative, seven could be characterised as centrist parties, and three – including Nicaragua's Communists – had traditionally been on the far left of the political spectrum.

Despite internal struggle, the UNO coalition under Violeta Chamorro succeeded in its campaign centered on the economic downfall and promises of peace. Chamorro promised to end military draft, initiate democratic reconciliation, and restore economic growth. Many Nicaraguans felt that the contra war and bad economy would continue if the FSLN remained in power, because of the strong United States opposition to the FSLN (in November 1989, the White House had announced that the economic embargo against Nicaragua would end if Violeta Chamorro won.).

Meanwhile, resources and organisational help were given to the UNO by the United States government's National Endowment for Democracy (NED), which in June 1989 had receive $2 million from U.S. Congress, which had also approved in April 1989 a package of $49.75 million in 'nonlethal' aid to the Contras, which funded their pro-UNO propaganda campaign. Some villages reported threats of murder from the Contras if they voted for the FSLN in the elections. 

In the presidential election held on 25 February 1990, Violeta Barrios de Chamorro won 55% of the popular vote against Daniel Ortega's 41%.

The UNO disbanded in the mid-1990s, after a very fractious rule during which little progress was made. The most positive consequence of their electoral victory was the end of the Contra War and the US economic embargo.

Member parties

The APC, PANC, and PCN announced in 1992 that they would merge as the National Conservative Party (Partido Conservador Nationalista—PCN) for the 1996 elections.

References

External links
http://www.country-data.com/cgi-bin/query/r-9286.html
https://web.archive.org/web/20061110115230/http://www.nicaraguasc.org.uk/aboutnicaragua/from1979.htm
https://www.nytimes.com/1990/03/01/world/turnover-in-nicaragua-the-parties-that-beat-the-sandinistas.html

Organizations of the Nicaraguan Revolution
Political parties established in 1990
Political history of Nicaragua
Defunct political parties in Nicaragua
Political party alliances in Nicaragua